The Fair Love (lit. "Fair Love") is a 2010 South Korean romance film starring Ahn Sung-ki and Lee Ha-na. It premiered at the 2009 Busan International Film Festival, and was released in theaters on January 14, 2010.

Plot
Hyung-man (Ahn Sung-ki) is a man in his 50s who leads a lonely, ordered life. He runs a small camera repair shop, and his mastery of this intricate skill draws customers from across the city. He also has a talent for photography, though for him it's more of a hobby than a vocation. He's still single, in fact he has never even dated a woman before. If the world were more fair he would be materially secure, but years earlier one of his best friends, Ki-hyuk, took his life savings and ran off. Since then, his life has never been the same.

Therefore, he is stunned and flummoxed when his former friend Ki-hyuk summons him to his deathbed for an unconvincing apology and, on top of that, a request. Ki-hyuk's daughter Nam-eun (Lee Ha-na), now in her 20s, will be alone after he is gone, so Ki-hyuk asks Hyung-man to please stop in every once in a while and check on her after he dies. Hyung-man feels rightly that he owes his friend nothing. But the daughter has done him no wrong, so after Ki-hyuk passes away, Hyung-man eventually knocks on her door.

Upon meeting her, he notices that Nam-eun seems to be more distressed over the death of her pet cat than her father's. Meanwhile, Nam-eun finds Hyung-man intriguing, so using his dirty laundry as an excuse, she begins to visit him frequently and gradually falls for him. When she expresses her feelings for him, Hyung-man is at first shocked. But as his awkwardness fades, he realizes that he reciprocates, and he starts to feel and even act like a teenager in love. Despite a twenty-six-year age difference, Hyung-man and Nam-eun decide to embark on a relationship.

Cast
Ahn Sung-ki  ...  Hyung-man 
Lee Ha-na ...  Nam-eun
Yun Seung-jun ...  Jin-tae
Lee Hyeon-ho ...  Jae-hyeong 
Kim Jeong-seok ... Jeong-seok
Kim In-soo ...  Reverend Kang
Kwon Hyeok-poong ... President Yoon
Choi Jong-ryeol ... Hyung-man's brother
Kim Min-kyeong ... Sister-in-law
Heo Yeon-jeong ...  Jae-eun
Jeong Seong-il ... Jae-woong
Yoo In-na  ...  Jin-hee 
Kil Chang-gyu ...  Ki-hyuk 
Lee Choon-yeon ... Store owner

References

External links
  
 
 
 

2010 films
2010 romantic drama films
Films directed by Shin Yeon-shick
South Korean romantic drama films
2010s South Korean films